Niukluk River is a waterway in the U.S. state of Alaska. Below the mouth of Melsing Creek, the valley broadens out and merges with that of Fish River, to which the Niukluk is tributary. It receives many tributaries, of which the Koksuktapaga, joining it from the south, is the largest. In Niukluk River itself, gold was found at its head, though most abundant below the mouth of American Creek. Just below the mouth of Ophir Creek, a little gold has been rocked out on the bars. The broad gravel flood plain in this part of the basin is said to be auriferous. These benches are sheeted over by a few feet of gravel.

See also
List of rivers of Alaska

References

Rivers of the Seward Peninsula
Rivers of Alaska
Rivers of Nome Census Area, Alaska
Rivers of Unorganized Borough, Alaska